Tolgo il disturbo, internationally released as I'll Be Going Now, is a 1990 Italian comedy-drama film directed by Dino Risi.

Plot 
Augusto Scribani is an old retired, cultured and genteel, who comes to Rome to visit his children and his granddaughter Rosa. The child and Augusto soon become attached to time, causing the anger and jealousy of parents. In fact, the couple are two business people and do not care much to small, and so Augusto shows his disappointment. The old man so completely quarrels with his son, and is out of the house, while the little Carla droops in pain.

Cast 
 Vittorio Gassman: Augusto Scribani 
 Elliott Gould: Alcide 
 Dominique Sanda: Carla 
 Eva Grimaldi: Ines 
 Firmine Richard: Anita  
 Monica Scattini: Margherita
 Valentina Holtkamp: Rosa

References

External links

1990 films
Films directed by Dino Risi
Commedia all'italiana
1990 comedy-drama films
Films about old age
Italian comedy-drama films
1990s Italian films